Maria Selvaggia Borghini (1656–1731) was an Italian poet and translator.

Works 

Rime della Signora Lucrezia Marinella, Veronica Gambara and Isabella della Morra, con giunta di quelle  raccolte della Signora Maria Selvaggia Borghini, Napoli: Bulifon 1693
Rime di cinquanta illustri poetesse di nuovo date in luce da Antonio Bulifon,  Napoli: Bulifon 1695 
Componimenti poetici delle più illustri rimatrici raccolti da Luisa Bergalli, Venezia, Mora 1726 
Raccolta del Recanati, Venezia 1716
Raccolta del Redi
Opere di Tertulliano tradotte in Toscano dalla Signora Selvaggia Borghini, Nobile Pisana, Roma, Pagliarini 1756
Saggio di Poesia, a cura di Domenico Moreni, Firenze, Margheri 1827
Lettera e sonetto di Maria Selvaggia Borghini finora inediti, a cura di Emilio Bianchi, Pisa, Nistri 1872
Per le nozze del sig. cav. conte Alfredo Agostini Venerosi Della Seta patrizio pisano colla nobile donzella Teresa contessa Marcello patrizia veneta, Pisa, 1882
Il Canzoniere di Maria Selvaggia Borghini, a cura di Agostino Agostini, Alessandro Panajia, Pisa, ETS 2001

References
 G. Ballistreri, Borghini Maria Selvaggia, «Dizionario biografico degli italiani», treccani.it.

1656 births
1731 deaths
People from Pisa
17th-century Italian women writers
17th-century Italian writers
18th-century Italian women writers
18th-century Italian writers
Italian women poets
Members of the Academy of Arcadians
Translators from Greek
Latin–Italian translators
Translators to Italian
17th-century Italian translators
18th-century Italian translators